Hydrotriche is a genus of flowering plants belonging to the family Plantaginaceae.

Its native range is Madagascar.

Species:

Hydrotriche bryoides 
Hydrotriche galiifolia 
Hydrotriche hottoniiflora 
Hydrotriche mayacoides

References

Plantaginaceae
Plantaginaceae genera